Al-Ḥaql is a sub-district located in the Jabal Habashi District, Taiz Governorate, Yemen. Al-Ḥaql had a population of 6,260 according to the 2004 census.

References 

Sub-districts in Jabal Habashi District